Daniel Gunn may refer to:

Daniel Gunn (ice hockey) (born 1978), Australian ice hockey player
Daniel Gunn (minister) (1774–1848), Scottish congregational minister
Dr. Daniel Gunn, fictional character in Alas, Babylon